Tompkinsville is a populated place in Charles County, Maryland. It was the site of a post office. William J. Frere lived there.

References

Populated places in Charles County, Maryland